A progress trap is the condition human societies experience when, in pursuing progress through human ingenuity, they inadvertently introduce problems that they do not have the resources or the political will to solve for fear of short-term losses in status, stability or quality of life. This prevents further progress and sometimes leads to societal collapse.

The syndrome appears to have been first described by Walter Von Krämer in his series of 1989 articles under the title Fortschrittsfalle Medizin. The specific neologism "progress trap" was introduced independently in 1990 by Daniel B. O'Leary with his study of the behavioral aspects of the condition: The Progress Trap – Science, Humanity and Environment.

The term later gained attention after the historian and novelist Ronald Wright's 2004 book and Massey Lecture series A Short History of Progress in which he sketches world history so far as a succession of progress traps. With the documentary film version of Wright's book Surviving Progress, backed by Martin Scorsese, the concept achieved wider recognition.

Overview

While the idea is not new, Wright identifies the central problem as being one of scale and political will. According to him, the error is often to extrapolate from what appears to work well on a small scale to a larger scale, which depletes natural resources and causes environmental degradation. Large-scale implementation also tends to be subject to diminishing returns. As overpopulation, erosion, greenhouse gas emissions or other consequences become apparent, society is destabilized.

In a progress trap, those in positions of authority are unwilling to make changes necessary for future survival. To do so they would need to sacrifice their current status and political power at the top of a hierarchy. They may also be unable to raise public support and the necessary economic resources, even if they try. Deforestation and erosion in ancient Greece may be an example of the latter.

A new source of natural resources can provide a reprieve. The European discovery and exploitation of the "New World" is one example of this, but seems unlikely to be repeated today. Present global civilization has covered the planet to such an extent there are no new resources in sight. Wright concludes that if not averted by some other means, collapse will be on a global scale, if or when it comes. Current economic crises, population problems and global climate change are symptoms that highlight the interdependence of current national economies and ecologies.

The problem has deep historical roots, probably dating back to the origins of life on Earth 3.8 billion years ago. In the early Stone Age, improved hunting techniques in vulnerable areas caused the extinction of many prey species, leaving the enlarged populace without an adequate food supply. The only apparent alternative, agriculture, also proved to be a progress trap. Salination, deforestation, erosion and urban sprawl led to disease, malnutrition and so forth, hence shorter lives.

Almost any sphere of technology can prove to be a progress trap, as in the example of medicine and its possibly inadequate response to the drawbacks of the high-density agricultural practices (e.g. factory farming) it has enabled. Wright uses weapon technology gradually reaching the threat of total nuclear destruction to illustrate this point. Ultimately, Wright strives to counter at least the Victorian notion of "modernity" as unconditionally a good thing.

Behavioral causes
In Escaping the progress trap, O'Leary examines historical and scientific evidence for patterns and underlying causes of progress traps, arguing that individual behaviour is a contributing factor. He presents research from the neurosciences, notably the work of Roger W. Sperry and adherents in the field of lateralization of brain function. His study relates how individuals, institutions and societies can become invested in technocratic instruments in the service of short-term interests. In this scenario, humans diverge from a default interdependence with nature resulting in technical preoccupations that gradually inhibit innovative problem solving, thus compromising long-term survival. Where advances result from technical specialization and are harmful—such as desertification resulting from irrigation—the trend compounds itself and can be irreversible, with collapse of the enterprise following. Examples are Sumer and the Indus Valley civilization where irrigation canals slowly combined to increase soil salinity, preventing the land from supporting harvests on which populations relied. The decline of Seymour Cray's Control Data Corporation is a modern case. Continuing oil consumption in a time of climate change is an illustration of the problem; sustainable development is viewed as a solution.

O'Leary notes that progress traps are not limited to technology; the Medieval Church's rejection of Roger Bacon's science follows a pattern where the institution itself inhibits solutions to problems arising from its development. He asserts that behavioural contributors to the syndrome can be mitigated in balancing technical endeavour with creative and cultural development, so that individuals and societies are not pre-eminently technocratic. 

Iain McGilchrist's 2009 book The Master and His Emissary, provides neurological insight into behaviors where predominant attention to short-term interests might compromise long-term outcomes.

Art
Aurora Picture Show, a microcinema in Houston, Texas has released a collection of "informational videos by artists who use recent technological tools for purposes other than what they were designed to do and, in some instances, in direct opposition to their intended use". The title of the DVD is At your service: Escaping the Progress Trap.

See also
Cultural lag
Escalation of commitment, also known as irrational escalation
Prosophobia
Resilience (ecology)
Societal collapse
System justification

References

Sources
 British socialist newspaper review by Brian Precious
Zealand Listener review by David Larsen

Further reading
Collapse: How Societies Choose to Fail or Succeed by Jared Diamond
A Short History of Progress by Ronald Wright
The Icarus Paradox: How Exceptional Companies Bring About Their Own Downfall, by Danny Miller
The Geography of Hope by Chris Turner
A Green History of the World: The Environment and the Collapse of Great Civilizations by Clive Ponting 1993 
The Ingenuity Gap by Thomas Homer-Dixon
The Upside of Down: Catastrophe, Creativity, and the Renewal of Civilization by Thomas-Homer Dixon
The Collapse of Complex Societies, by Joseph Tainter
Progress and its Problems: Towards a Theory of Scientific Growth, by Larry Laudan 1977 
The Empty Raincoat: Making sense of the future by Charles Handy 1995. US version: The Age of Paradox 
 (Hardcover)

External links
Escaping the progress trap 2007 by Daniel O'Leary
2008 and 2007 web archives of articles and comments on progress traps by Professor Tadeusz W. Patzek, University of Texas, Austin
At your service: Escaping the Progress Trap
Michael S. Gazzaniga Spheres of Influence, MIND, May 2008
Eating the Earth by John Whiting

Progress
Cyclical theories